This is a list of Maryland music groups, consisting of groups of Marylanders who are musically notable, musically notable groups of people with a connection to Maryland, and other groups who are notable within the music of Maryland. Groups listed may be relevant to the state of Maryland, the Province of Maryland or the area now known as Maryland before it was either a state or colony.

See also
 Music of Annapolis

References

Notes
26. The SU Flyer

Lists of American musicians
Music groups